The Girl with the Hungry Eyes is a 1967 film written and directed by William Rotsler. It contains an early film appearance by Charlotte Stewart and a dance scene by Pat Barrington.

Plot
Kitty (Adele Rein) and Tigercat (Cathy Crowfoot) are two lesbians obsessed with one another.

Cast
 Adele Rein
 Cathy Crowfoot
 Pat Barrington
 Charlotte Stewart
 William Rotsler

References

External links

1967 films
1967 LGBT-related films
American LGBT-related films
Lesbian-related films
American independent films
American black-and-white films
1967 independent films
1960s English-language films
1960s American films